The Cave Creek Complex Wildfire was the third largest forest fire in the state of Arizona to date, after the Rodeo–Chediski Fire and Wallow Fire.

History
The fire started on June 21, 2005, by a lightning strike and scorched .

When news agencies were covering the story, a FOX news affiliate captured video of the historic Cave Creek Mistress mine destroyed by the fire as soon as the fire touched it. The mine was a total loss.

The largest recorded saguaro cactus — standing at 46 feet tall and having a base circumference of 7 feet, 10 inches — was also injured in this fire, and later collapsed.

Bibliography
 (2005). "FEMA Authorizes Funds To Help Arizona Fight Cave Creek Complex." FEMA.gov. Retrieved September 8.
 (2005). "Crews Work to Turn Arizona Wildfire Away From Homes." Los Angeles Times. June 24.
 (2005). "Western Flames." FOXNews. Retrieved September 8, 2007.

References

External links
 Incident report, last update (July 14, 2005)

2005 in Arizona
2005 wildfires in the United States
Wildfires in Arizona